Aliphatic (R)-hydroxynitrile lyase ((R)-HNL, (R)-oxynitrilase, (R)-hydroxynitrile lyase, LuHNL) is an enzyme with systematic name (2R)-2-hydroxy-2-methylbutanenitrile butan-2-one-lyase (cyanide forming). This enzyme catalyses the following chemical reaction:

 (2R)-2-hydroxy-2-methylbutanenitrile  cyanide + butan-2-one

The enzyme contains Zn2+.

References

External links 
 

EC 4.1.2